Ronnie Robinson (March 9, 1951 – May 8, 2004) was an American basketball player.

Robinson played high school basketball at Memphis Melrose High School, where one of his teammates was his future college and professional teammate, Larry Finch.

Robinson played college basketball in his hometown at Memphis State University. Robinson, Finch and Larry Kenon led Memphis State to the 1973 Final Four; the Tigers lost to the undefeated, Bill Walton-led UCLA Bruins in the Finals.  Affectionately nicknamed "The Big Cat" for his leaping ability, Robinson is one of eight University of Memphis Tigers basketball players to have his jersey number retired by the school.

A 6'8", 225 pound forward, Robinson finished his college career prior to the ABA-NBA merger and thus was selected in the fourth round of the 1973 NBA Draft by the Phoenix Suns and in the first round of the 1973 ABA Draft by the Utah Stars.  Robinson opted for the American Basketball Association and began the 1973-74 season with the Stars.  In January, the Memphis Tams traded Johnny Neumann to Utah for Robinson, Glen Combs, Mike Jackson and cash.  With the Stars and Tams throughout the 1973-74 season, Robinson appeared in 62 games, averaging 6.4 points and 4.5 rebounds per game.

Robinson spent the 1974-75 season with the Memphis Sounds.  With the Sounds, Robinson appeared in only 10 games, averaging 4.0 points and 2.7 rebounds per game.

References

1951 births
2004 deaths
American men's basketball players
Basketball players from Memphis, Tennessee
Memphis Sounds players
Memphis Tams players
Memphis Tigers men's basketball players
Phoenix Suns draft picks
Utah Stars draft picks
Utah Stars players